is a Japanese gravure idol who is affiliated with Asche. On July 13, 2009, she won the "Second Annual Meeting of the Japanese Idol Award" of Zakzak. She had working on producing industries, such as DVDs parallel to gravure and acting.

Filmography

Films

References

External links
 Official profile at Asche 
 Profile at Sponichi 
 Profile at Mondo TV 

Japanese gravure idols
1988 births
Living people
Actresses from Yokohama